Lucía Caraballo (born 1999) is a Spanish actress and dancer. Since 2006, at age seven, she has been active in the entertainment business world, after being accepted as a student at the Universidad Popular de Madrid, Tarugo Company.

Filmography
Caraballo has acted in a number of Spanish films, including:
Uniformed- , 2010, as "Esther"
Buenas Noches, Dijo La Señorita Pajaro- 2012
El Amor Me Queda Grande- 2014, as "Lucia"
La Mujer Que Hablaba Con Los Muertos- 2014, as young "Ursula"
Los Huesos Del Frio- 2014, as "Lucia"

Television
Caraballo has also participated in multiple television shows nationally in Spain, including:
 Águila Roja- 2009
 Paco's Men- 2009
 Física o Química - 2009
 Hospital Central- 2008 and 2009, as "Nadia" and "Nuria"
 Gran Reserva - 2010, as young "Lucia"
 Víctor Ros - 2014
 El Caso. Crónica De Sucesos - 2016
 Estoy vivo (2017–21) as Bea
 La reina del pueblo (2021) as Inma
 No me gusta conducir'' (2022) as Yolanda

References 

1999 births
Living people
Spanish child actresses
Spanish film actresses
Spanish television actresses
21st-century Spanish actresses